T.C. Roberson High School is a high school in the Buncombe County Schools System in Asheville, North Carolina. It is located at 250 Overlook Road, Asheville, NC 28803. TC Roberson High School was founded when Valley Springs High School and Biltmore High School were combined to form one high school. It is named for Thomas Crawford Roberson, a former Superintendent of Buncombe County Schools and the architect of the consolidation of 21 county high schools into the 6 county high schools that exist today. Its school newspaper is the Golden Fleece. It has two feeder schools – Valley Springs Middle School and half of the students at Cane Creek Middle School.

T.C. Roberson is located right by W.W. Estes Elementary School, Valley Springs Middle School, as well as Charles T. Koontz Intermediate School, making it a convenient location for both parents and students. Roberson is also home to the Progressive Education Program (PEP) which is a program dedicated to students with both mental and physical disabilities. The PEP program allows these students to attend school and have the same opportunities as any other student, such as having gym class, art class, math and reading lessons, and getting to meet and interact with classmates. The current principal of the PEP program is Larry Wiegel.

Athletics 
Roberson is affiliated with the North Carolina High School Athletic Association (NCHSAA). Its team name are the Rams, with the school colors being blue and gold.

In North Carolina, Roberson is ranked fifth in team state championships holding a total of 37. In addition, Roberson has won the AAA Wachovia Cup (award for best overall athletic program in the state of North Carolina) for three straight years and five times since the Wachovia Cup was created in 1979.

Roberson's main rivals in athletics in the Asheville area are A.C. Reynolds High School, and Asheville High School. T.C. Roberson is well known for being a powerhouse in basketball, soccer, cross country, swimming, tennis, and baseball. It is noteworthy that there have been four Roberson baseball players selected in the MLB Draft since 2000. In 2017, the baseball team won a state championship, marking the fourth in its history for T.C. Roberson baseball.

Notable alumni

Athletics 
 Logan Allen, MLB pitcher 
 Josh Bonifay, former professional baseball player and coach
 Braxton Davidson, #32 overall draft pick of 2014 Major League Baseball Draft by Atlanta Braves
 Darren Holmes, former MLB pitcher and 1998 World Series champion with the New York Yankees
 Joel McKeithan, MLB coach
 Cameron Maybin, MLB player and 2017 World Series champion with the Houston Astros
 Christian Moody, former Kansas Jayhawks basketball player who was also named "Greatest Walk-On of All Time" by ESPN
 Chris Narveson, former MLB pitcher
 David Testo, professional soccer player with the Columbus Crew, Vancouver Whitecaps, and Montreal Impact
 Roy Williams, retired men's basketball head coach at the University of North Carolina at Chapel Hill

Other 
Judy Clarke, attorney, known as a "one-woman Dream Team", an anti-death penalty advocate, has defended Eric Rudolph, The Unabomber, and Susan Smith
Michael McFee, poet and essayist
Riley Howell, student, known for taking down a gunman in the 2019 University of North Carolina at Charlotte shooting
Robert A. Phillips, George R. Gardiner Professor of Business Ethics  - Schulich School of Business - York University

References

External links 
 School History from Official Website

Public high schools in North Carolina
Schools in Buncombe County, North Carolina
Educational institutions established in 1962
1962 establishments in North Carolina